1,8-Dibromooctane is a chemical compound used in the synthesis of the carbamate nerve agents EA-3990 and octamethylene-bis(5-dimethylcarbamoxyisoquinolinium bromide).

References

Bromoalkanes
Nerve agent precursors